Jim Hosking is a British film director.

His first short film, Little Clumps of Hair, premiered on BBC Three.

His short film Renegades premiered at the Sundance Film Festival in 2010.

He directed the segment "G is for Grandad" for the film ABCs of Death 2 in 2014.

His first feature film The Greasy Strangler premiered at the Sundance Film Festival on 22 January 2016. It went on to win The Discovery Award at the British Independent Film Awards 2016. It also won Best Comedy at the Empire Film Awards 2017.

His second feature film An Evening with Beverly Luff Linn premiered at the Sundance Film Festival on 20 January 2018.

He co-wrote and directed the show Tropical Cop Tales which premiered on 1 February 2019 on Adult Swim in the US.

He is represented for Film and TV by the Independent Talent Group in the UK,
and by United Talent Agency in the US.

Filmography

Feature films

Short films

Television

References

External links

Official Jim Hosking website

Year of birth missing (living people)
Living people
English film directors
People from Bath, Somerset
Advertising directors